Hady George Kahy (born 2 April 1968) is a Lebanese judoka and economist. He competed in the men's lightweight event at the 1992 Summer Olympics. His last result at the event was a ranking of 22nd for the men's lightweight 71 kg category. He is currently an associate professor of economics and political economy at Temple University, Japan Campus.

References

1968 births
Living people
Lebanese male judoka
Olympic judoka of Lebanon
Judoka at the 1992 Summer Olympics
Place of birth missing (living people)